Maturba is a locality in Algeria, North Africa.

During the Roman Empire there was a Roman town located here. That town  flourished in late antiquity from AD 300 to AD640. The town did not last long after the Muslim conquest of the Maghreb.

Maturba was also the seat of an ancient titular bishopric of the Roman Catholic Church. The bishopric survives today as a titular see. The current bishop is Paul Simick who replaced José Luís Gerardo Ponce de León in 2014.

References

Roman towns and cities in Mauretania Caesariensis
Catholic titular sees in Africa
Former Roman Catholic dioceses in Africa
Ancient Berber cities